An electron orbital may refer to:

 An atomic orbital, describing the behaviour of an electron in an atom
 A molecular orbital, describing the behaviour of an electron in a molecule

See also 

 Electron configuration, the arrangement of electrons in structures such as atoms or molecules
 Orbital hybridization, a combining of atomic orbitals to form an equal number of hybrid orbitals when forming certain molecules